Hyperaspis fastidiosa, the fastidious lady beetle, is a species of lady beetle in the family Coccinellidae. It is found in North America.

Subspecies
These two subspecies belong to the species Hyperaspis fastidiosa:
 Hyperaspis fastidiosa fastidiosa
 Hyperaspis fastidiosa septentrionis Dobzhansky

References

Further reading

 

Coccinellidae
Articles created by Qbugbot
Beetles described in 1908